Jungle Queen is a Hindi action drama film of Bollywood, directed by K. Chandra and produced by Ramesh Purushottam. This film was released in 1991. Music director of the film was Anand–Milind.

Plot

Cast
 Satish Shah
 Feroz Khan
 Poonam Dasgupta
 Dalip Tahil
 Shiva Rindani
 Gajendra Chauhan
 Raghu Khosla

Music
" Ek Do Teen" - Abhijeet, Sapna Mukherjee
"Hum Tumhein Mil Gaye" - Suresh Wadkar, Sadhana Sargam
"Hum Tumhein Mil Gaye v2" - Suresh Wadkar, Sadhana Sargam
"Main Haan Haan Karti Hoon" - Abhijeet, Sapna Mukherjee
"Naache Mayura" - Anuradha Paudwal
"O Meri Jungle Queen" - Udit Narayan, Kavita Krishnamurthy

References

External links
 

1990s action drama films
1991 films
1990s Hindi-language films
Films scored by Anand–Milind
Indian action drama films